Servier Laboratories
André Servier, Algerian-born French historian
H. Servier, French composer
Serviers-et-Labaume, a commune in southern France